The 2009 RACC Rallye de Catalunya was the eleventh round of the 2009 World Rally Championship season and the 45th running of Rally Catalunya. The rally consisted of 18 special stages and took place between October 2–4, 2009. Citroën's Sébastien Loeb and Dani Sordo took their fourth Catalunya double win in a row.
Loeb's title rival Mikko Hirvonen of Ford finished third and will head to the season-ending Rally GB with a one-point lead over Loeb. Petter Solberg made his debut in a Citroën C4 WRC, finishing fourth and recording four stage wins.

Results

Special stages

References

External links
Official website 
Event at WRC.com

Catalunya
Rally Catalunya
Catalunya